The following is a list of Australian penal colonies that existed from the establishment of European presence in the 1780s up until the nineteenth century. The term colony had referred to settlements and larger land areas at that time.

Notes

Penal colonies, List of Australian
List of Australian penal colonies
Defunct prisons in Australia